Eunice Lulu Parsons (born August 4, 1916), also known as Eunice Jensen Parsons, is an American modernist artist known for her collages. Parsons was born in Loma, Colorado, and currently lives in Portland, Oregon. She studied at the School of the Art Institute of Chicago and the Portland Museum Art School, where she also worked as a teacher for over 20 years.

Early life and education 
The daughter of Florence Alta (Weed) Parsons and Brainerd Parsons, Eunice Parsons was born in Loma, Colorado, in 1916. Her family lived briefly in Montana, but when she was age four, her family moved to Chicago. In 1934 and 1935, she attended children's art classes at the School of the Art Institute of Chicago. She was married to Allen Herbert Jensen from 1936 to 1960, and they lived in Portland, Oregon, raising three children there. From 1950 to 1954, she studied at the Portland Museum Art School. In 1957 she took a bus to New York, Philadelphia, and Washington, D.C., to study abstract expressionism. Her sketchbooks from that trip demonstrate her early inclinations in "color, line, and shading, all developing into a unique and distinctive style".

Career 
Parsons joined the faculty of the Portland Museum Art School as a painting instructor, where she was known as a "blunt but brilliant" teacher. She also taught printmaking and composition between 1957 and 1979. Her career has also included teaching classes at Portland State University.

Parsons was a co-founder of the 12x16gallery in southeast Portland, a cooperative which exhibited artists' work between 2006 and 2017.

She exhibited new collage works, Eunice Parsons, La Centenaire, at the Roll-Up Photo Studio Gallery in Portland to celebrate her centennial year in 2016. At age 100 in 2017, she was the only remaining living artist from the 2004 group exhibition, "Northwest Matriarchs of Modernism", at Marylhurst University's gallery, The Art Gym. That exhibition had also included artists LaVerne Krause, Maude Kerns, Mary Henry, Sally Haley, and Hilda Morris.

Critical reception 
Called an American master of collage, Parsons uses torn and cut paper, words and phrases to create "striking and evocative collage works." Her work is held in permanent collections at the Hallie Ford Museum of Art, the Jordan Schnltzer Museum of Art at the University of Oregon, Kaiser Permanente and the Portland Art Museum.

Isaac Peterson at PortlandArt.net called Parsons' collages "painterly", writing that they are "composed with intricate consideration, but occasionally she moves with a speed and daring any skater would admire". Marc Andres of Portland Community College described Parsons' process of creating collage as one of creation and destruction, adding that it is "at once both extremely spontaneous in its generation and equally methodical in its resolution". Blair Saxon Hill compared her artistic style to that of European artists like Kurt Schwitters or Miró.

In a 2005 review, Victoria Blake wrote of Parsons' view that "collage, like life, is an art of imperfection, of the torn edge and the spot of glue". Blake continued that Parsons has "the ability to recognize the chance encounter for what it is: potential in its purist form".

Exhibitions 
Marylhurst University – The Art Gym
Willamette University, Hallie Ford Museum of Art
 Jordan Schnitzer Museum of Art, Eugene, OR
 Portland Art Museum, Portland, OR
 Smithsonian Institution, Washington, D.C.
Marylhurst University, The Art Gym, Portland, OR
Portland Community College, Helzer Art Gallery, Portland, OR

Awards and honors 
In 2001, Pacific Northwest College of Art presented an honorary Master of Fine Arts to Parsons, as well as displaying "Eunice Parsons, a Fifty Year Retrospective" at the college's Felman Gallery. In addition, philanthropist Stephen Wiener donated an endowment for student travel scholarships in Parson's name.

Further reading 
Parsons is included in two books featuring notable artists of Oregon:

See also 
 American modernism

References

External links 
the Art of Eunice Parsons
Portland Art Museum Online Collections: Eunice Jensen Parsons
 (video 26:06)
 (video, 6:32)
 (video, 6:34)
 (video, 6:59)

1916 births
American centenarians
Artists from Colorado
Artists from Portland, Oregon
American collage artists
Women collage artists
Living people
Pacific Northwest College of Art alumni
People from Mesa County, Colorado
School of the Art Institute of Chicago alumni
Women centenarians
20th-century American artists
20th-century American women artists
21st-century American artists
21st-century American women artists